Be Strong, Geum-soon! is a 2005 South Korean television series starring Han Hye-jin and Kang Ji-hwan. It aired on MBC from February 14, 2005 to September 30, 2005 on Mondays to Fridays at 20:20 for 163 episodes.

Synopsis
The drama starts off with Geum-soon in the midst of a hairdressing exam in beautician school, which she fails after suffering a high-tide in her bladder. She marries Song-hwan, who dies in a car accident days later She then moves in with her in-laws and gives birth to son Hwi-seong. She takes on various jobs to earn their keep (although her mother-in-law initially suggests that she should stay at home for another year to look after the baby): she promotes nutritional-drink products in the Korea University Hospital, then went on to be an apprentice in a hair salon.

Geum-soon gets into an accident after her scooter crashes into the car of a fastidious young doctor who reports her to the police and picks up every tiny little fault from a broken finger to a sprained ankle. Later, much to her surprise, when she applies to apprentice at the hair salon, she's shocked to realize that the doctor is the salon owner's son! Eun-ju, the salon's assistant-manager, initially rejects her application because they already have more than enough staff, but later Jae-hee and Mi-ja decide they should employ her.

Geum-soon is placed under the guidance of a colleague, Hae-mee, who bullies her. She changes her hairstyle from a "cabbage-head" (her nickname for Jae-hee) to her a straight and curly one. She loses her job shortly after revealing her past to Miss Yoon after being late one day and her secret is discovered by the assistant-manager.

Cast
 Han Hye-jin as Na Geum-soon
 Kang Ji-hwan as Goo Jae-hee
 Kim Nam-gil  as Noh Seong-hwan
 Lee Min-ki as Noh Tae-hwan
 Kim Seo-hyung as Ha Seong-ran
 Youn Yuh-jung as Kim Jin-soon
 Choi Ja-hye as Na Geum-ah
 Yang Hee-kyung as Ahn Soon-ji
 Park In-hwan as Noh So-jang
 Kim Ja-ok as Son Jung-sim
 Kim Yu-seok as Noh Si-hwan
 Jang Yong as Jang Ki-jong
 Yang Mi-kyung as Kim Young-ok
 Lee Se-eun as Jang Eun-ju
 Yoon Mi-ra as Oh Mi-ja
 Lee Hee-do as Na Sang-do
 Chae Eun-seo as Ahn Hae-mee
 Hwang Hye-hee as Yun So-ran
 Song Seung-hwan as Seung-hwan	
 Woo Kang-ha as Ah-ki

References

External links
 Be Strong, Geum-soon! official MBC website 
 Be Strong, Geum-soon at MBC Global Media
 
 Be Strong, Geum-soon! at Koreanwiz

MBC TV television dramas
2005 South Korean television series debuts
2005 South Korean television series endings
Korean-language television shows
South Korean romance television series
South Korean comedy television series